Basic leucine zipper transcription factor, ATF-like, also known as BATF, is a protein which in humans is encoded by the BATF gene.

Function 

The protein encoded by this gene is a nuclear basic leucine zipper (bZIP) protein that belongs to the AP-1/ATF superfamily of transcription factors. The leucine zipper of this protein mediates dimerization with members of the Jun family of proteins. This protein is thought to be a negative regulator of AP-1/ATF transcriptional events.

Mice without the BATF gene (BATF knockout mice) lacked a type of inflammatory immune cell (Th17) and were resistant to conditions that normally induces an autoimmune condition similar to multiple sclerosis.

Interactions 

BATF (gene) has been shown to interact with IFI35.

References

Further reading

External links 
 
 
 

Transcription factors